Acantharctia tenuifasciata is a moth of the family Erebidae. It was described by George Hampson in 1910. It is found in the Democratic Republic of the Congo, Kenya, Malawi and Tanzania.

References

Moths described in 1910
Spilosomina
Moths of Africa